is a shōjo manga by Sayuri Tatsuyama (creator of Happy Happy Clover). It was published by Shogakukan in the magazine Ciao from 1999 to 2005 and collected in ten tankōbon volumes. In 2002, it won the Shogakukan Manga Award for children's manga. The author based the series on her own pet.

Game
 Available: March 26, 2004
 Model: Game Boy Advance

Characters

References

External links
 

Adventure anime and manga
Shogakukan manga
Shōjo manga
1999 manga
Winners of the Shogakukan Manga Award for children's manga